Yuri Mladenov (born 22 August 1977) is a Bulgarian boxer. He competed in the men's featherweight event at the 2000 Summer Olympics.

References

1977 births
Living people
Bulgarian male boxers
Olympic boxers of Bulgaria
Boxers at the 2000 Summer Olympics
Place of birth missing (living people)
Featherweight boxers